Rakesh Vinubhai Dhruv (born 12 May 1981) is a former Indian cricketer who played for Gujarat in Indian domestic cricket. He was a slow left-arm orthodox bowler. He represented the India A cricket team in 2013. In October 2017, he announced his retirement from all forms of cricket.

Career
Dhruv made his first-class debut for Saurashtra in the 1999/00 season. He played for Saurashtra until the 2010/11 season. In 2012, he switched to Gujarat and made immediate impact with his bowling. In a Ranji Trophy group match against Rajasthan in December 2012, Dhruv picked up 6/65 in the first innings and 8/31 in the second innings. He finished the season with 36 wickets from eight matches at an average of 25.55. His impressive bowling was rewarded by the national selectors who drafted him into the India A squad for the three-day match against the touring Australian team in February 2013. He picked up 5/31 in the first innings and 1/37 in the second innings, taking wickets of regular Test batsmen such as Shane Watson and Ed Cowan.

References

External links 

1981 births
Living people
Indian cricketers
Saurashtra cricketers
West Zone cricketers
Gujarat cricketers
People from Jamnagar